The Bila Tserkva massacre was the World War II mass murder of Jews, committed by the Nazi German Einsatzgruppe with the aid of Ukrainian auxiliaries, in Bila Tserkva, Soviet Ukraine, on August 21–22, 1941. When the Jewish adult population of Bila Tserkva was killed, several functionaries complained that some 90 Jewish children were left behind in an abandoned building, and had to be executed separately. The soldiers reported the matter to four chaplains of the Heer, who passed along their protests to Field Marshal von Reichenau; it was the only time during World War II that Wehrmacht chaplains tried to prevent an Einsatzgruppen massacre, but Paul Blobel's verbal order was direct and decisive.

Description
In August 1941, General Walther von Reichenau, commander of the 6th Army of Nazi Germany, ordered his men to assist the Einsatzgruppen and their Ukrainian auxiliaries with killing the Jews of Bila Tserkva. Over the course of the following days, virtually the entire adult Jewish population of Bila Tserkva was shot. All that remained were the children and a few of the women, who were dumped off at a school to await execution.

Several soldiers were disturbed by the crying of the children and infants at the school, and asked their chaplains what to do. The two chaplains attached to the 295th Infantry Division, Catholic Father Ernst Tewes and Lutheran Pastor Gerhard Wilczek, visited the school. They were appalled by the condition of the frightened, hungry children. The chaplains asked the local army commander to free the children, but he refused. Tewes later reported he "turned out to be a convinced anti-Semitic". Joined by two other chaplains from the 295th Division, a series of protest letters were sent to people in positions of authority asking that the children of Bila Tserkva be spared. The chaplains won over staff officer Lieutenant-Colonel Helmuth Groscurth to their cause. He ordered a postponement of the planned massacre of the children. In areas near the front, the Einsatzgruppen were under Army command and so when Colonel Groscurth ordered the massacre to be delayed, the local Einsatzkommando leader had no choice but to comply. Ultimately, von Reichenau himself intervened and ordered the executions to go ahead. After receiving a protest letter from two of the chaplains, Reichenau wrote in response:

Tewes later recalled, "All those we wanted to save were shot. Because of our initiative it just happened a few days later than planned". SS-Obersturmführer August Häfner who saw the subsequent murders on 21 August 1941 testified at his own 1965 trial as follows:

The protests at Bila Tserkva were unique as being the only time during the war that Wehrmacht chaplains tried to prevent an Einsatzgruppen massacre. The American historian Doris Bergen wrote that all four chaplains involved in the protest were aware that Jewish adults were being killed and protested only when they learned that children were to be shot. Bergen further observed the "terrible irony" that a gesture of protest further served the genocidal aims of the regime; the soldiers who were troubled by the crying of the children waiting for their time to die felt that they had "dealt with" the issue by "doing something", namely appealing to Father Tewes and Wilczek, and they had no further role to play in this matter.

References

Bibliography
 
  (originally published as )

Bila Tserkva
1941 in Ukraine
Massacres in 1941
Mass murder in 1941
Holocaust massacres and pogroms in Ukraine
August 1941 events